In astrodynamics or celestial mechanics a parabolic trajectory is a Kepler orbit with the eccentricity equal to 1 and is an unbound orbit that is exactly on the border between elliptical and hyperbolic. When moving away from the source it is called an escape orbit, otherwise a capture orbit. It is also sometimes referred to as a C3 = 0 orbit (see Characteristic energy).

Under standard assumptions a body traveling along an escape orbit will coast along a parabolic trajectory to infinity, with velocity relative to the central body tending to zero, and therefore will never return. Parabolic trajectories are minimum-energy escape trajectories, separating positive-energy hyperbolic trajectories from negative-energy elliptic orbits.

Velocity
The orbital velocity of a body travelling along parabolic trajectory can be computed as:

where:
 is the radial distance of orbiting body from central body,
 is the standard gravitational parameter.

At any position the orbiting body has the escape velocity for that position.

If a body has an escape velocity with respect to the Earth, this is not enough to escape the Solar System, so near the Earth the orbit resembles a parabola, but further away it bends into an elliptical orbit around the Sun.

This velocity is closely related to the orbital velocity of a body in a circular orbit of the radius equal to the radial position of orbiting body on the parabolic trajectory:

where:
 is orbital velocity of a body in circular orbit.

Equation of motion
For a body moving along this kind of trajectory an orbital equation becomes:

where:
 is radial distance of orbiting body from central body,
 is specific angular momentum of the orbiting body,
 is a true anomaly of the orbiting body,
 is the standard gravitational parameter.

Energy
Under standard assumptions, the specific orbital energy of a parabolic trajectory is zero, so the orbital energy conservation equation for this trajectory takes the form:

where:
 is orbital velocity of orbiting body,
 is radial distance of orbiting body from central body,
 is the standard gravitational parameter.

This is entirely equivalent to the characteristic energy (square of the speed at infinity) being 0:

Barker's equation

Barker's equation relates the time of flight  to the true anomaly  of a parabolic trajectory:

where:
 is an auxiliary variable
 is the time of periapsis passage
 is the standard gravitational parameter
 is the semi-latus rectum of the trajectory

More generally, the time between any two points on an orbit is

Alternately, the equation can be expressed in terms of periapsis distance, in a parabolic orbit :

If the following substitutions are made

then
 

With hyperbolic functions the solution can be also expressed as:

 

where

Radial parabolic trajectory
A radial parabolic trajectory is a non-periodic trajectory on a straight line where the relative velocity of the two objects is always the escape velocity. There are two cases: the bodies move away from each other or towards each other.

There is a rather simple expression for the position as function of time:
 

where 
 μ is the standard gravitational parameter
  corresponds to the extrapolated time of the fictitious starting or ending at the center of the central body.

To have  at the surface, apply a time shift; for the Earth (and any other spherically symmetric body with the same average density) as central body this time shift is 6 minutes and 20 seconds; seven of these periods later the height above the surface is three times the radius, etc.

See also
 Kepler orbit
 Parabola

References

Orbits